Dr. Annasaheb Shinde College of Agricultural Engineering and Technology, Rahuri, Maharashtra is named after Annasaheb Shinde, the former Union Minister of State for Agriculture.

History

This College was established in 1969 for B.Tech. Its post graduate degree programme began in 1982.

Courses undertaken

The College imparts education in the discipline of: 
Agricultural Process Engineering 
Farm Machinery and Power 
Farm Structures and Rural Electrification 
Irrigation and Drainage Engineering 
Soil and Water Conservation Engineering

In addition, other agricultural and basic science courses such as Botany, Plant Pathology, Mathematics, Physics and Statistics are offered as supporting courses.

Admissions

On the basis of the performance in MHT CET, with Physics, Chemistry and Mathematics, students are given admission to B.Tech. For M.Tech. the minimum qualification is B.Tech and must qualify MCAER CET. The academic programme is of two-year duration for M.Tech. (4 semesters) and four years for B.Tech. (8 semesters) including one month Summer Placement Training at the end of second and third years for B.Tech. During the fourth year, students have industrial training for four months and guided to have individual design project culminating with Project Report.

References
http://mpkv.mah.nic.in/ENGG_HOME.HTM

Agricultural universities and colleges in Maharashtra
Engineering colleges in Maharashtra
Education in Ahmednagar district
Educational institutions established in 1969
1969 establishments in Maharashtra